Helen Lessore OBE (31 October 1907 – 6 May 1994) was a gallerist and the director of the Beaux Arts Gallery in London as well as an English modernist painter and visual artist.

Early life
She was born Helen Brook on 31 October 1907 in London, England. Her father, Abraham Brook (c.1876–1944), had come to London from Lithuania. Her mother, Edith Berliner (1881–1935), was English, from a Frankfurt family of Spanish descent.

Brook studied at the Slade School of Fine Art from 1924 to 1928.

She married the sculptor and gallerist Frederick Lessore in 1934. They had two sons, Henry Lessore, a writer, born 1937, and John Lessore, an artist, born 1939.

Career

Beaux Arts Gallery
In 1931 she began to work as a secretary at the Beaux Arts Gallery, which was founded by the sculptor Frederick Lessore, on Bruton Place in London. Increasingly involved in the running of the gallery and the management of artists, she published the first of many articles on the painter Walter Sickert in 1932. In the years following World War II, the Beaux Arts Gallery became noted for championing figurative painting.

When Frederick died in 1951, Helen took over full directorship of the gallery. Under her leadership, the Beaux Arts Gallery became specifically known for exhibiting artists from the Kitchen Sink School. In particular, four artists from the Kitchen Sink School became known as the Beaux Arts Quartet: John Bratby, Derrick Greaves, Jack Smith and Edward Middleditch. It is especially noteworthy that each of these artists was chosen before they achieved widespread recognition at the 1956 Venice Biennial.

Lessore was also key in championing young, unknown artists. For instance, Francis Bacon had a solo exhibition at the Beaux Art Gallery in 1953. Frank Auerbach and Leon Kossoff held their first solo exhibitions at the gallery in 1956 and 1957, respectively.

Lessore ran the gallery until its closure in 1965. The gallery's final exhibition was a show of her son, the artist John Lessore.

Artist

A full retrospective of Lessore's paintings was exhibited at the Fine Art Society in London in 1987. Her paintings can currently be found in public collections around Great Britain, including the Tate Britain. and the Royal Academy of Arts.

Recognition
Lessore was made an Order of the British Empire (OBE) in 1958 for her services to the arts at the 1958 Birthday Honours.

References

Further reading
Helen Lessore, Partial Testament, 1987, Tate Publishing,

External links
 

1907 births
1994 deaths
20th-century English painters
20th-century English women artists
Alumni of the Slade School of Fine Art
Artists from London
Royal Academicians